Mammea novoguineensis is a species of flowering plant in the Calophyllaceae family. It is found in West Papua (Indonesia) and Papua New Guinea.

References

novoguineensis
Flora of Western New Guinea
Flora of Papua New Guinea
Data deficient plants
Taxonomy articles created by Polbot